1066 is a year in history.

History
 Battle of Stamford Bridge, a battle on September 25, 1066, between an English army under King Harold Godwinson and an invading Norwegian force under King Harald Hardrada
 Battle of Hastings, a battle on October 14, 1066, between the English army under King Harold Godwinson, and the French-Norman army under William, Duke of Normandy

Fiction and dramatisations
1066 and All That, a 1930 book that parodies English history textbooks
 1066 The Battle for Middle Earth, a two-episode TV dramatisation, made in 2009

1066 (film), a movie in pre-production as of 2017, starring Mark Lester as King Harold Godwinson

Other uses

International Harvester 1066, a popular tractor model made between 1971 and 1976